Mihai Dan Ionescu (born 29 September 1968) is a Romanian former footballer who played as a midfielder. After he ended his playing career, he worked as a manager. In 2017 Ionescu received the Honorary Citizen of Dragomirești title.

Honours
Ceahlăul Piatra Neamț
Divizia B: 1992–93

References

1968 births
Living people
Romanian footballers
Association football midfielders
Liga I players
Liga II players
Moldovan Super Liga players
CSM Ceahlăul Piatra Neamț players
FC Tiraspol players
Romanian expatriate footballers
Romanian expatriates in Moldova
Expatriate footballers in Moldova
Romanian expatriate sportspeople in Moldova
Romanian football managers
CSM Ceahlăul Piatra Neamț managers
CS Aerostar Bacău managers
Sportspeople from Piatra Neamț